Katy Boyer (Katherine McLeod Boyer) is an American actress. She played Tim Robbins' love interest in the cult comedy Tapeheads directed by Bill Fishman and parental figures in two science-fiction movies directed by Steven Spielberg, The Lost World: Jurassic Park and Minority Report, billed as "Benjamin's Mom" and "Mother" respectively, as well as an alien named "Zero One" on an episode of Star Trek: The Next Generation.

Filmography
 Minority Report (2002) - Mother
 Tripfall (2000) - Lonnie Campos
 Three Secrets (1999) - Cassie (as Kate Boyer)
 The Lost World: Jurassic Park (1997) - Benjamin's Mom
 A Nightmare Come True (1997) - Sarah
 Race Against Time: The Search for Sarah (1996) - Danielle
 See Jane Run (1995) - Paula Marinelli
 White Dwarf (1995) - Lady X the Immortal Prisoner
 Black Widow Murders: The Blanche Taylor Moore Story (1993) - Lujane
 Trapped (1989) - Renni
 Tapeheads (1988) - Belinda Mart
 The Town Bully (1988) - Kit Moran West
 Winnie (1988) - Ruby Rose
 The King of Love (1987) - Lorna
 Long Gone (1987) - Esther Wrenn
 Just One of the Guys (1985) - Jeanine
She has guest-starred on:

 NCIS
 The X-Files
 CSI: Crime Scene Investigation
 The Shield
 Angel
 Millennium
 Sliders
 Silk Stalkings
 Babylon 5 (1994) episode "By Any Means Necessary"
 21 Jump Street 
 In the Heat of the Night
 Star Trek: The Next Generation
 Growing Pains
 Beauty and the Beast episode "God Bless the Child"
 ''Ghost Whisperer (2007) episode Don't Try This at Home (3x2) as Eliza Mumford

External links

Year of birth missing (living people)
Living people
American film actresses
American television actresses
21st-century American women